Lior Raz (born 24 November 1971) is an Israeli actor and screenwriter. He portrays Doron Kabilio in the political thriller television series Fauda and  Segev Azulai in Hit & Run.

Early life
Raz was born in Ma'ale Adumim, an Israeli settlement of 40,000 inhabitants seven kilometers from Jerusalem, where he grew up as well. His parents immigrated to Israel from Iraq and Algeria. His father served in Israel in Shayetet 13 and in Shin Bet before later running a plant nursery. His mother is a teacher. His native language is Hebrew, although Raz grew up also speaking Arabic with his father and grandmother at home, and with some Arab workers, who were his playmates, at his father's plant nursery.

After Raz graduated from high school at the age of 18, he enlisted in the Israel Defense Forces and became a commando in the elite undercover counter-terrorism unit known as Sayeret Duvdevan. He also served in the Duvdevan Unit in the reserves for 20 years.

For three years, until Raz was 19, he had a girlfriend named Iris Azulai. In October 1990, a Palestinian Arab stabbed her to death with a 15-inch knife in Jerusalem. The man who stabbed her was later released from prison in the 2011 Gilad Shalit prisoner exchange in which 1,027 prisoners were released in order to obtain the release from captivity of the kidnapped Israeli soldier Gilad Shalit, who had been held prisoner by Hamas for five years.

In 1993, after his military service, Raz moved to the United States, and was hired by a security contracting firm as Arnold Schwarzenegger's bodyguard. In an interview with Israel Hayom he said: “the company turned to me since they knew my military background, for me it was the most glamorous thing, to be the watchdog of Schwarzenegger and his wife".

Career
When Raz returned to Israel at age 24, he studied at Nissan Nativ Drama School in Tel Aviv.

In his early acting years, Raz acted in various plays, such as Don Juan at Gesher Theater, Macbeth and The Teenagers. He also played small roles on Israeli TV series. In 2004, he played a police investigator in Michaela, and 'referee Ben Shabat' in Adumot. In 2005 he appeared as Shimi in his first feature film Gotta Be Happy. In 2008 he appeared in television drama Srugim as Yisrael, and a year later in comedy-drama  Mesudarim as a Shin Bet agent, and as Maor in Noah's Ark. In 2011 he played a police unit commander in Nadav Lapid's drama film Policeman, and as Asa'el in the political drama Prime Minister's Children alongside Rami Heuberger.

In 2012, Raz portrayed Nissan Title in yes psychological thriller spying-drama The Gordin Cell, and appeared in the film The World is Funny as Barak. In 2013, he played the role of the police commander in the fourth season of the crime drama series  The Arbitrator, and in 2014 appeared in the film The Kindergarten Teacher.

In 2014, he created with Haaretz journalist Avi Issacharoff the critically acclaimed political thriller television series Fauda, in which Raz stars as Doron Kabilio, the commander of an undercover counter-terrorism Mista'arvim unit. In 2016, the show won six awards, including Best Drama Series, at the Israeli Academy Awards. In December 2017, The New York Times voted Fauda the best international show of 2017. In 2018, the show won 11 Israeli TV Academy Awards, including best TV drama, best actor for Raz, and best screenplay, casting, cinematography, recording, and special effects.

In 2018, Raz played a Magdala community leader in the film Mary Magdalene, written by Helen Edmundson. The same year, he appeared in Operation Finale, playing Isser Harel, the Director of Israel’s intelligence agency, the Mossad.

In August 2021, Netflix released a new series named Hit & Run which stars Raz. The show was co-created by Raz, Avi Issacharof, Dawn Prestwich and Nicole Yorkin.

Personal life
Raz is married to Israeli actress Meital Berdah, and they have four children. They reside in Ramat Aviv, Israel.

Filmography

References

External links

1971 births
Living people
Israeli male film actors
Israeli Mizrahi Jews
Israeli people of Algerian-Jewish descent
Israeli people of Iraqi-Jewish descent
21st-century Israeli male actors
Israeli male television actors
People from Ramat HaSharon
People from Ma'ale Adumim
People from Jerusalem
Bodyguards